Tilichiki Airport (also Korf Airport)  is an airport in Kamchatka Krai, Russia located 5 km south of Tilichiki. It services small transport aircraft and is located on a sand islet.

Airlines and destinations

References
RussianAirFields.com

Airports built in the Soviet Union
Airports in Kamchatka Krai